Thiophenol is an organosulfur compound with the formula C6H5SH, sometimes abbreviated as PhSH.  This foul-smelling colorless liquid is the simplest aromatic thiol.  The chemical structures of thiophenol and its derivatives are analogous to phenols . An exception is the oxygen atom in the hydroxyl group (-OH) bonded to the aromatic ring is replaced by a sulfur atom. The prefix thio- implies a sulfur-containing compound and when used before a root word name for a compound which would normally contain an oxygen atom, in the case of 'thiol' that the alcohol oxygen atom is replaced by a sulfur atom.

Thiophenols also describes a class of compounds formally derived from thiophenol itself.  All have a sulfhydryl group (-SH) covalently bonded to an aromatic ring.  The organosulfur ligand in the medicine thiomersal is a thiophenol.

Synthesis
There are several methods of synthesis for thiophenol and related compounds, although thiophenol itself is usually purchased for laboratory operations. 2 methods are the reduction of benzenesulfonyl chloride with zinc and the action of elemental sulfur on phenyl magnesium halide or phenyllithium followed by acidification.

Via the Newman–Kwart rearrangement, phenols (1) can be converted to the thiophenols (5) by conversion to the O-aryl dialkylthiocarbamates (3), followed by heating to give the isomeric S-aryl derivative (4).

In the Leuckart thiophenol reaction, the starting material is an aniline through the diazonium salt (ArN2X) and the xanthate (ArS(C=S)OR). Alternatively, sodium sulfide and triazene can react in organic solutions and yield thiophenols.

The disulfide is the primary byproduct. The reaction medium is corrosive and requires ceramic or similar reactor lining. Aryl iodides and sulfur in certain conditions may also produce thiophenols.

Applications
Thiophenols are used in the production of pharmaceuticals including of sulfonamides.  The antifungal agents butoconazole and merthiolate are derivatives of thiophenols.

Properties and reactions

Acidity
Thiophenol has appreciably greater acidity than does phenol, as is shown by their pKa values (6.62 for thiophenol and 9.95 for phenol). A similar pattern is seen for H2S versus H2O, and all thiols versus the corresponding alcohols. Treatment of PhSH with strong base such as sodium hydroxide (NaOH) or sodium metal affords the salt sodium thiophenolate (PhSNa).

Alkylation
The thiophenolate is highly nucleophilic, which translates to a high rate of alkylation. Thus, treatment of C6H5SH with methyl iodide in the presence of a base gives methyl phenyl sulfide, C6H5SCH3, a thioether often referred to as thioanisole. Such reactions are fairly irreversible.  C6H5SH also adds to α,β-unsaturated carbonyls via Michael addition.

Oxidation
Thiophenols, especially in the presence of base are easily oxidized to diphenyl disulfide:
 4 C6H5SH + O2 → 2 C6H5S-SC6H5 + 2 H2O
The disulfide can be reduced back the thiol using sodium borohydride followed by acidification. This redox reaction is also exploited in the use of C6H5SH as a source of H atoms.

Chlorination
Phenylsulfenyl chloride, a blood-red liquid (b.p. 41–42 °C, 1.5 mm Hg), can be prepared by the reaction of thiophenol with chlorine (Cl2).

Coordination to metals
Metal cations form thiophenolates, some of which are polymeric. One example is "C6H5SCu," obtained by treating copper(I) chloride with thiophenol.

Safety
The US National Institute for Occupational Safety and Health has established a recommended exposure limit at a ceiling of 0.1 ppm (0.5 mg m−3), and exposures not greater than 15 minutes.

References

External links
 Thiophenol, Toxicology Data Network

Thiols
Phenyl compounds
Foul-smelling chemicals